Mikhail Nikolayevich Loginov (21 November 1903 in village of Ivanishinskiye Gorky (now in Staritsky District, Tver Oblast) – 28 October 1940 in Miskhor, Crimean ASSR) was a prominent Soviet designer of anti-tank, air-defense, and other types of artillery, widely used during World War II.

Being a chief designer of the design bureau of 8th Kalinin Artillery plant in Kaliningrad (Moscow Oblast), he created, among others, 45-mm anti-tank gun M1937 (53-K), 76-mm air-defense gun M1938, 37-mm air-defense gun M1939 (61-K), 85-mm air-defense gun M1939 (52-K), 25 mm automatic air defense gun M1940 (72-K).

Loginov died in 1940 of tuberculosis. For his achievements he was rewarded with Order of the Red Star (1937), Order of Lenin (1939), and Stalin Prize (1941, after his death).  He was initially buried in Livadiya, Crimea, but his ashes were exhumed and reburied with military honours in the Federal Military Memorial Cemetery in Moscow Oblast on 3 September 2020.

References 

1903 births
1940 deaths
20th-century deaths from tuberculosis
Russian inventors
Soviet inventors
Soviet people of World War II
Stalin Prize winners
Weapon designers
Tuberculosis deaths in the Soviet Union
Burials at the Federal Military Memorial Cemetery
Recipients of the Order of Lenin